"The Snow" (Welsh:  or ) is a 14th- or 15th-century Welsh-language poem in the form of a cywydd evoking a landscape which, to the poet's chagrin, is covered with snow.  It has been described as an imaginative tour de force.  Manuscripts of the poem mostly attribute it to Dafydd ap Gwilym, widely seen as the greatest of the Welsh poets, though some name Dafydd ab Edmwnd or Ieuan ap Rhys ap Llywelyn as the author.  Modern literary historians have differed as to whether it is indeed by Dafydd ap Gwilym, but the two most recent editions of his poems (by Thomas Parry and Dafydd Johnston respectively) have rejected it.  The poem has nevertheless remained popular with translators and it continues to appear in anthologies, including Thomas Parry's own Oxford Book of Welsh Verse and Gwyn Jones's Oxford Book of Welsh Verse in English.

Synopsis 

The poet laments that he cannot leave the house because when he does he is covered with snow; everyone has been so covered since New Year's Day.  Snow has whitewashed the ground and covered the trees with fur.  What will God do with all this now, these bees of Heaven, these fleeces, these white angels?  The poet invites us to "See the taking from the bottom of the flour-loft a plank." and further compares the snow to, among other things, quicksilver, a cloak, cement, and "a pavement vaster than sea's graveyard".  The earth has had its brains spilled out.  Who will bring it all to an end?  Where is the rain?

Manuscripts and recensions 

"The Snow" survives in 46 manuscripts.  Among the earliest are British Library Additional MS 14967 (after 1527), Peniarth MS 49 (16th/17th century, written by John Davies), Cardiff MS 4.330 (1574, written by Thomas Wiliems), and Cardiff MS 2.114 (1564-1566, written at the court of Rowland Meyrick).  There are two main recensions of the poem, one beginning with the words , "I cannot", and one beginning , "I will not sleep".  A third recension, evidenced by fewer manuscripts, begins , "I will not walk".

Attribution 

A large majority of the surviving manuscripts of this poem, including Cardiff MS 4.330 and Peniarth MS 49, mentioned above, attribute it to Dafydd ap Gwilym. However, two of them, including the very earliest, BL Add. MS 14967, assign it to Ieuan ap Rhys ap Llywelyn, and another two to Dafydd ab Edmwnd with the suggestion that it might be Dafydd ap Gwilym's; both Ieuan ap Rhys and Dafydd ab Edmwnd lived at least a century after Dafydd ap Gwilym's time. Its style, he summed up, was exactly that of the 15th century, and he favoured the claims of Ieuan ap Rhys, though when he included it in his Oxford Book of Welsh Verse (1962) he labelled it as an anonymous 15th century poem. Parry's rejection of the poem from the Dafydd ap Gwilym canon proved very controversial and provoked many protests from other scholars, notably in two papers by D. J. Bowen. Nevertheless, the most recent edition of his poems, by Dafydd Johnston and others, again excluded "The Snow".

Language and metaphor 

"The Snow" is only one of a number of poems attributed to Dafydd ap Gwilym on elemental themes, such as the mist, the moon, and the stars. In particular, he compares these inanimate subjects to aspects of human activity – flour falling through the hole in a loft floor, feathers being plucked from a goose, and so on – thereby bringing them down to earth. Some of the metaphors used in "The Snow" can be paralleled elsewhere. At one point "The Snow" compares its subject to the white "bees from heaven", a reference to the legend, recorded in the Welsh Laws, that bees were white until they were expelled from Paradise along with Adam. It also makes a rare and valuable reference to medieval Welsh drama when it tells us that "feathers settle on the gown like an actor playing a dragon". In English mummers' plays one actor would similarly wear a cloak of feathers in imitation of a dragon's scales.

English translations and paraphrases 

 Bell, H. Idris, in   With the Middle Welsh original in parallel text.

 

   With the Middle Welsh original in parallel text.

 

 

 

   Abridged translation.
 Repr. in 

 

 

 Parry, R. Williams, in

Notes

References 

 
 
 
 

14th-century poems
Poetry by Dafydd ap Gwilym
Snow in culture
Works of uncertain authorship